Dade County is a county located in the southwest part of the U.S. state of Missouri. As of the 2020 census, the population was 7,569. Its county seat is Greenfield. The county was organized in 1841 and named after Major Francis L. Dade of Virginia, who was killed in the Second Seminole War in 1835.

Geography

Adjacent counties
Cedar County (north)
Polk County (northeast)
Greene County (southeast)
Lawrence County (south)
Jasper County (southwest)
Barton County (west)

Major highways
 U.S. Route 160
 Route 39
 Route 97

Demographics

As of the census of 2000, there were 7,923 people, 3,202 households, and 2,276 families residing in the county.  The population density was 16 people per square mile (6/km2).  There were 3,758 housing units at an average density of 8 per square mile (3/km2).  The racial makeup of the county was 97.45% White, 0.27% Black or African American, 0.71% Native American, 0.14% Asian, 0.05% Pacific Islander, 0.19% from other races, and 1.20% from two or more races. Approximately 0.85% of the population were Hispanic or Latino of any race.

There were 3,202 households, out of which 29.10% had children under the age of 18 living with them, 61.30% were married couples living together, 6.50% had a female householder with no husband present, and 28.90% were non-families. 26.50% of all households were made up of individuals, and 14.70% had someone living alone who was 65 years of age or older.  The average household size was 2.44 and the average family size was 2.93.

In the county, the population was spread out, with 24.30% under the age of 18, 6.80% from 18 to 24, 24.10% from 25 to 44, 24.40% from 45 to 64, and 20.30% who were 65 years of age or older.  The median age was 42 years. For every 100 females there were 95.90 males.  For every 100 females age 18 and over, there were 92.50 males.

The median income for a household in the county was $29,097, and the median income for a family was $33,651. Males had a median income of $26,092 versus $18,464 for females. The per capita income for the county was $14,254.  About 9.30% of families and 13.40% of the population were below the poverty line, including 17.10% of those under age 18 and 13.10% of those age 65 or over.

2020 Census

Education

Public schools
Dadeville R-II School District – Dadeville
Dadeville Elementary School (K-06)
Dadeville High School (07-12)
Everton R-III School District – Everton
Everton Elementary School (K-05)
Everton Middle School (06-08)
Everton High School (09-12)
Greenfield R-IV School District – Greenfield
Greenfield Elementary School (PK-06)
Greenfield High School (07-12)
Lockwood R-I School District – Lockwood
Lockwood Elementary School (PK-08)
Lockwood High School (09-12)

Private schools
Immanuel Lutheran School – Lockwood (PK-08) – Lutheran
Faith Fellowship Christian Academy – Greenfield (PK-10)  - Baptist

Public libraries
Dade County Library  
Lockwood Public Library

Politics

Local
The Republican Party predominantly controls politics at the local level in Dade County. Republicans hold all but one of the elected positions in the county.

State

All of Dade County is a part of Missouri's 127th District in the Missouri House of Representatives and is represented by Mike Kelley (R-Lamar).

All of Dade County is a part of Missouri's 32nd District in the Missouri Senate and is currently represented by Ron Richard (R-Joplin).

Federal

All of Dade County is included in Missouri's 4th Congressional District and is currently represented by Vicky Hartzler (R-Harrisonville) in the U.S. House of Representatives.

Political Culture

Missouri presidential preference primary (2008)

Former Governor Mike Huckabee (R-Arkansas) received more votes, a total of 769, than any candidate from either party in Dade County during the 2008 presidential primary. He fell just 25 votes short from receiving the same number of votes cast in the entire Democratic primary in Dade County.

Communities

Cities and towns

Arcola
Dadeville
Everton
Greenfield (county seat)
Lockwood
South Greenfield

Unincorporated communities

 Bona
 Cedarville
 Comet
 Corry
 Dudenville
 Kings Point
 Meinert
 Pennsboro
 Sylvania

Townships

See also
National Register of Historic Places listings in Dade County, Missouri

References

External links
 Digitized 1930 Plat Book of Dade County  from University of Missouri Division of Special Collections, Archives, and Rare Books

 
Missouri counties
1841 establishments in Missouri
Populated places established in 1841